Dagmara Grad (born 1 June 1990) is a Polish footballer who plays as a defender and has appeared for the Poland women's national team.

Career
Grad has been capped for the Poland national team, appearing for the team during the 2019 FIFA Women's World Cup qualifying cycle.

References

External links
 
 
 

1990 births
Living people
Polish women's footballers
Women's association football defenders
BV Cloppenburg (women) players
Poland women's international footballers
Polish expatriate footballers
Polish expatriate sportspeople in Germany
Expatriate women's footballers in Germany